Alex Andrew Murray (born 21 October 1992) is a Guyanese footballer who plays as a goalkeeper for Morvant Caledonia United and the Guyana national football team.

Career

International
Murray made his senior international debut on 21 February 2016, keeping a clean sheet in a 2-0 friendly victory over Suriname. Murray was included in Guyana's squad for the 2019 Gold Cup, but he failed to make an appearance.

Career statistics

International

References

External links

1992 births
Living people
Alpha United FC players
Georgetown FC players
Santos FC (Guyana) players
Morvant Caledonia United players
TT Pro League players
Guyanese footballers
Guyana international footballers
Association football goalkeepers